Calypso was one of two s built for the French Navy in the first decade of the 20th century.

Design and description
The Circé class were built as part of the French Navy's 1904 building program to a double-hull design by Maxime Laubeuf. The submarines displaced  surfaced and  submerged. Their crew numbered 2 officers and 20 enlisted men.

For surface running, the boats were powered by two German MAN  diesel engines, each driving one propeller shaft. When submerged each propeller was driven by a  electric motor.

Construction and career
The Circé-class submarines were ordered on 8 October 1904. Calypso was laid down in 1905 at the Arsenal de Toulon, launched on 24 October 1907 and commissioned on 5 August 1909.

Citations

Bibliography

Circé-class submarine (1907)
World War I submarines of France
1907 ships
Maritime incidents in July 1914
Ships sunk in collisions